"The Wreck of the 'Antoinette'" is a song by Dave Dee, Dozy, Beaky, Mick & Tich, released as a single in September 1968. It peaked at number 14 on the UK Singles Chart.

Background and release
The song title refers to the Antoinette, a barque that was shipwrecked on the Doom Bar. The song details the romance between a girl and a fictionalised crew member who drowned in the sinking of the Antoinette. The first lyrics of the spoken intro, "full fathom five", are taken from William Shakespeare's play The Tempest.

The single was scheduled for release in the US by Imperial Records in November 1968, but it remains unreleased there.

Reception
Reviewing for New Musical Express, Derek Johnson wrote that "two tiny faults struck me – I wasn't very keen on the sombre monologue opening; and the routine is taken at such a frantic pace that, occasionally, one gets the impression of too many words being crammed into each line". But he also wrote that "in the main, this is fast-moving, punchy and electrifying". Chris Welch for Melody Maker wrote that "a furious rock beat prevails, and pressure rises throughout the voyage. Clever lyrics once again by the jolly tars from Hampstead, and a harpoon of a hit". For Record Mirror, Peter Jones wrote "interesting intro sets the scene, then that extremely distinctive vocal sound takes over, spearheaded by Dave himself. Easy melody line, good lyrics, usual high spirits… oh, yes, a hit".

Track listing
 "The Wreck of the 'Antoinette'" – 3:06
 "Still Life" – 2:59

Charts

References

1968 singles
1968 songs
Fontana Records singles
Songs written by Alan Blaikley
Songs written by Ken Howard (composer)
Number-one singles in New Zealand
Song recordings produced by Steve Rowland